Parallax Studio is an American animation studio based in Nixa, Missouri, created by J. Allen Williams.  The company is most known for the production of the science fiction computer game Darkstar: The Interactive Movie, which starred the original cast of Mystery Science Theater 3000 the actor Clive Robertson, and the actor Peter Graves in his final released work.  The game also featured designs by the comic artist Richard Corben,  Darkstar was released November 5, 2010 through Strategy First, company website, and later in stores through Lace Mamba Global in 2011.

On March 10, 2012, Parallax Studio announced via Facebook starting pre-production on a full-length fantasy film Everything.  The company later ran a Kickstarter to raise additional funds for the film.

In 2020, Parallax Studio announced production on a second independent film MEAD (originally titled To Meet the Faces You Meet), based on the underground comic Fever Dreams by Jan Strnad and Richard Corben, featuring the voice of Patton Oswalt. On July 20, 2020, it was announced that the actors Patrick Warburton and Samuel Hunt had joined the cast. In September 2020, it was announced that Robert Picardo had also joined the cast. Principal photography began in late September and ended in early October 2021. MEAD was premiered at the 2022 Cannes Film Festival on May 22, 2022, and will be released for streaming in North America on August 9, 2022.

Productions
2010 - Darkstar: The Interactive Movie (video game)
2017 - Everything (film)
2022 - MEAD (film)

References

External links
Official Parallax Studio Website

American animation studios